Mexican auto insurance provides vehicle insurance  for tourists driving in Mexico. This type of insurance was created because U.S. insurance policies are not recognized by authorities in  Mexico in the event of an accident.

A liability-only policy provides coverage for medical expenses and property damage to third parties if someone is involved in an accident. Full coverage policies are available as well, including physical damage and theft coverage. Policies are available from one day up to one year with most annual policies costing less than a policy in the United States. They are available both by walk-in offices near the border and over the internet.

Under Mexico's driving system, those deemed to be at fault in an auto accident are guilty until proven innocent. If injuries have been sustained, those at fault are then responsible for not only medical expenses but also providing financial support for the injured parties and their families until they recover.

If the driver is disagreeing with the police’s evaluation, he can request a judge reviews the case within 24 hours.

References

Road transportation in Mexico
Insurance by country
Finance in Mexico
Tourism in Mexico
Vehicle insurance